Vicksburg High School is a 9-12 public high school in Vicksburg, Michigan.  It is part of the Vicksburg Community Schools.

Academics
In the 2022 U.S. News & World Report public high school rankings, Vicksburg was ranked 108th in the state of Michigan and 3rd in the Kalamazoo area.

Demographics
The demographic breakdown for the 777 students enrolled during the 2021-22 school year was:

Male - 49.0%
Female - 51.0%
Native American/Alaskan - 0.4%
Asian - 0 5%
Black - 1.3%
Hispanic - 4.0%
Native Hawaiian/Pacific islanders - 0.1%
White - 89.1%
Multiracial - 4.6%

22.7% of the students were eligible for free or reduced-cost lunch.

Athletics
The Vicksburg athletic teams are known as the Bulldogs and the school colors are red and white.  The Bulldogs compete in the Wolverine Conference.  The following MHSAA sanctioned sports are offered at Vicksburg High School:

Baseball (boys)
Basketball (girls & boys)
Bowling (girls & boys)
Competitive cheerleading (girls)
Cross country (girls & boys)
Boys state champions - 1963
Football (boys)
Golf (girls & boys)
Lacrosse (boys)
Soccer (girls & boys)
Softball (girls)
Tennis (girls & boys)
Boys state champions - 1974
Track & field (girls & boys)
Volleyball (girls)
Wrestling (boys)

In November 1977, The Bulldogs were the subject of a two part story in Sports Illustrated, chronicling the impact of high school football on a small town.

References

External links 
 
 Vicksburg Community Schools website

Public high schools in Michigan
Schools in Kalamazoo County, Michigan